Whisnant is a surname. Notable people with the surname include:
Clayton J. Whisnant, American historian
Gene Whisnant (born 1943), American politician
Luke Whisnant (born 1957), American writer and poet
Rebecca Whisnant, American feminist, writer and academic

See also
Whisnant Nunatak, a nunatak of Princess Elizabeth Land, Antarctica